Piotr Wiktor Misztal (born 19 October 1965 in Łódź) is a Polish politician. He was elected to the Sejm on 25 September 2005, getting 8890 votes in 9 Łódź district as a candidate from the Samoobrona Rzeczpospolitej Polskiej list.

See also
List of Sejm members (2005–2009)

External links
Piotr Misztal - parliamentary page - includes declarations of interest, voting record, and transcripts of speeches.

Members of the Polish Sejm 2005–2007
1965 births
Living people
Politicians from Łódź